Filtering in the context of large eddy simulation (LES) is a mathematical operation intended to remove a range of small scales from the solution to the Navier-Stokes equations.  Because the principal difficulty in simulating turbulent flows comes from the wide range of length and time scales, this operation makes turbulent flow simulation cheaper by reducing the range of scales that must be resolved.  The LES filter operation is low-pass, meaning it filters out the scales associated with high frequencies.

Homogeneous filters

Definition in physical space 
The low-pass filtering operation used in LES can be applied to a spatial and temporal field, for example .  The LES filter operation may be spatial, temporal, or both.  The filtered field, denoted with a bar, is defined as:

where  is a convolution kernel unique to the filter type used.  This can be written as a convolution operation:

The filter kernel  uses cutoff length and time scales, denoted  and  respectively.  Scales smaller than these are eliminated from   Using this definition, any field  may be split up into a filtered and sub-filtered (denoted with a prime) portion, as

This can also be written as a convolution operation,

Definition in spectral space 

The filtering operation removes scales associated with high frequencies, and the operation can accordingly be interpreted in Fourier space.

or,

The spectral interpretation of the filtering operation is essential to the filtering operation in large eddy simulation, as the spectra of turbulent flows is central to LES subgrid-scale models, which reconstruct the effect of the sub-filter scales (the highest frequencies).  One of the challenges in subgrid modeling is to effectively mimic the cascade of kinetic energy from low to high frequencies.  This makes the spectral properties of the implemented LES filter very important to subgrid modeling efforts.

Homogeneous filter properties 

Homogeneous LES filters must satisfy the following set of properties when applied to the Navier-Stokes equations.

1. Conservation of constants

The value of a filtered constant must be equal to the constant,

which implies,

2. Linearity

3. Commutation with derivatives

then this third property can be expressed as

Filters satisfying these properties are generally not Reynolds operators, meaning, first:

and second,

Inhomogeneous filters 

Implementations of filtering operations for all but the simplest flows are inhomogeneous filter operations.  This means that the flow either has non-periodic boundaries, causing problems with certain types of filters, or has a non-constant filter width , or both.  This prevents the filter from commuting with derivatives, and the commutation operation leads to several additional error terms:

where  is the vector normal to the surface of the boundary  and 

The two terms both appear due to inhomogeneities.  The first is due to the spatial variation in the filter size  while the second is due to the domain boundary.  Similarly, the commutation of the filter  with the temporal derivative leads to an error term resulting from temporal variation in the filter size,

Several filter operations which eliminate or minimize these error terms have been proposed.

Classic large eddy simulation filters 

There are three filters ordinarily used for spatial filtering in large eddy simulation.

Box filter 

The filter kernel in physical space is given by:

The filter kernel in spectral space is given by:

Gaussian filter 

The filter kernel in physical space is given by:

The filter kernel in spectral space is given by:

Sharp spectral filter 

The filter kernel in physical space is given by:

The filter kernel in spectral space is given by:

See also 

 Computational fluid dynamics
 Filter (signal processing)
 Fluid mechanics
 Fourier transform
 Frequency domain
 Large eddy simulation
 Turbulence

References

Turbulence models